Thanet Coast is an  biological and  geological Site of Special Scientific Interest which stretches along the coast between Whitstable and Ramsgate in Kent. It is a Geological Conservation Review site, and overlaps two Special Area of Conservations. It is also part of a Ramsar Site and a Special Protection Area. Part of it is a Local Nature Reserve,

This site has unstable cliffs and foreshore, saltmarsh, lagoons, woodland and grassland. It has internationally important numbers of wintering birds and three nationally rare invertebrates. It is also an important Palaeocene site and paleobotanical locality.

Natural England divides the Site of Special Scientific Interest into units. The Church Commissioners own some of the land on which unit 10, unit 11 and unit 12 are situated

References

Sites of Special Scientific Interest in Kent
Geological Conservation Review sites
Special Protection Areas in England
Special Areas of Conservation in England
Ramsar sites in England
Thanet
Kent coast